Kamiabad (also Romanized as Kamīābād) is a village in Sharqi Rural District, in the Central District of Ardabil County, Ardabil Province, Iran. At the 2006 census, its population was 563, in 128 families.

References 

Towns and villages in Ardabil County